Luisa Peluffo (born August 20, 1941) is an Argentine writer and journalist.

Peluffo was born in Buenos Aires.  In 1977, she took up residence in San Carlos de Bariloche in the province of Río Negro, Argentina. Her residence in Patagonia is reflected in her writing, particularly in Me voy a vivir al sur, one of her most popular books. There she shares the experience to move from her urban life in Buenos Aires to the extreme south of her country. In 1988, she was awarded the scholarship Creation in Narrative by the Fondo Nacional de las Artes (National Endowment for the Arts). In 2001, her book Un color inexistente received the Carmen Conde Women's Poetry Award. In 2008, her novel Nadie baila el tango (No one dances the tango) (Ediciones Gárgola, 2008) was awarded the first prize for unpublished novels given by the Gobierno de la Ciudad de Buenos Aires (Buenos Aires City government). An English translation of her story "Flechas" ("Arrowheads") was published in the book Argentina: A Traveler’s Literary Companion (Whereabouts Press, 2010).

Published work
 Fotografías (poems) – Ediciones Gárgola, Buenos Aires, 2014
 Se llaman valijas (stories) – Ediciones Gárgola, Buenos Aires, 2012
 Nadie baila el tango (novel) – Ediciones Gárgola, Buenos Aires, 2008
 Me voy a vivir al sur (chronicle) – First edition: Editorial de los Cuatro Vientos, Buenos Aires, 2005; Second edition: Ediciones Gárgola, Buenos Aires, 2010
 Un color inexistente (poems) – Ediciones Torremozas, Madrid, España, 2001
 La doble vida (novel) – Editorial Atlántida, Colección Voces del Plata, Buenos Aires, 1993
 La otra orilla (poems) – Editorial Ultimo Reino, Buenos Aires, 1991
 Todo eso oyes (novel) – Emecé Editores, Buenos Aires, 1989
 Materia de revelaciones (poems) – Ediciones Botella al Mar, Buenos Aires, 1983
 Conspiraciones (stories) – First edition: Fundación Banco de la Provincia de Buenos Aires, Buenos Aires, 1982; Second edition: Editorial Universitaria de Buenos Aires, Buenos Aires, 1989
 Materia viva (poems) – Editorial Schapire, Colección Poetas Populares, Buenos Aires, 1974

Other contributions 
 Arrowheads (short story) – Argentina: A Traveler's Literary Companion, edited by Jill Gibian, Whereabouts Press, 2010
 La doble vida (excerpt) – Relatos de Patagonia, edited by María Sonia Cristoff, Editorial Cántaro, 2005
 Si canta un gallo (play) – El país teatral Serie Premios, Editorial Inteatro, 2005

Notes

Sources 
 Lorente-Murphy, Silvia. Las voces no-oficiales en Todo Eso Oyes de Luisa Peluffo. Revista Confluencia Vol. 8, No. 1, pp. 149–153, University of Northern Colorado, 1992 - .

External links
 
 Official blog 

People from Buenos Aires
People from Bariloche
Argentine women short story writers
1941 births
Living people
Argentine people of Italian descent